Tambay may refer to:
 Tambay (EP), an EP by Sponge Cola
 Patrick Tambay (1949-2022), French racing driver
 Adrien Tambay (born 1991), French racing driver
 Vijay Vasant Tambay, officer of the Indian Air Force
 Damayanti Tambay, Indian badminton player